Garden of Eden is an unincorporated community in Kankakee County, Illinois, United States.

The settlement is located on the Kankakee River.

References

Unincorporated communities in Illinois
Unincorporated communities in Kankakee County, Illinois